Wali-e-Mewat Raja Nahar Khan, Bahadur, birth name Raja Sonpar Pal, the ruler of Mewat, was the progenitor of Khanzada Rajput clan. He was converted to Islam by  Firuz Shah Tughlaq in 1355.

Background 
He was the son of Rajput Raja Lakhan Pal of Kotla Fort and great-grandson of Raja Adhan Pal (who was 4th in descent from Raja Tahan Pal). Tahan Pal, who founded Timangarh, was the eldest son of Maharaja Bijai Pal (founder of Bijai Garh and Maharaja of Karauli), who was 88th in descent from Krishna.

Conversion to Islam 
Kunwar Sonpar Pal (later Raja Nahar Khan) and his brother Kunwar Samar Pal (later Chaju Khan), the sons of Raja Lakhan Pal, were in service of Sultan Firuz Shah Tughlaq of Delhi Sultanate. They were accompanying the Sultan in one of his hunting expedition, where the Sultan was attacked by a tiger. Kunwar Sonpar Pal, with his brilliant archery skills, saved the Sultan by killing the tiger. Sultan Firuz then converted the brothers to  Islam. After converting to Islam, Sultan Firuz gave them the title of Khan. Kunwar Samar Pal's name was changed to Chaju Khan, while Kunwar Sonpar Pal was given the name of Nahar Khan.

Founder of Khanzada Rajput tribe 
Nahar Khan had nine sons, his descendants are known as Khanzada Rajput.

Wali of Mewat 
Raja Nahar Khan of Kotla was a high ranking noble  in the royal court of Delhi Sultanate. In 1372, Firuz Shah Tughlaq  granted him the Lordship of Mewat. He established a hereditary polity in Mewat and proclaimed the title of Wali-e-Mewat. After his ascension to the throne in 1372, the people of Mewat began to gradually convert to Islam. Later his descendants affirmed their own sovereignty in Mewat. They ruled Mewat till 1527. The last Khanzada Rajput ruler of Mewat was Hasan Khan Mewati, who died in the Battle of Khanwa against the invading Mughal forces of Babur.

Delhi Power Struggle 
In 1388, Raja Nahar Khan aided Abu Bakr Shah, grandson of the late Emperor Firuz Shah Tughlaq, in expelling from Dehli Abu Bakr's uncle Nasir-ud-Din Mahmud Shah Tughluq and in establishing the former on the throne. In a few months, however, Abu Bakr had to give away before Nasiruddin, and he then fled to Raja Nahar's stronghold in Mewat State, where he was pursued by Nasiruddin. After a struggle Abu Bakr and Raja Nahar surrendered, and Abu Bakr was placed in confinement for life in the fort of Meerut, but Raja Nahar received a robe and was allowed to depart.

Timur's Invasion of India 
In 1398 during Timur's Invasion of Delhi, Nahar Khan withdrew to his Kotla Tijara and watched the development of events from there. Mewat State during this time was flooded with fugitives fleeing from Delhi and Khizr Khan, (the future Sultan of Delhi), was one of those who took shelter in Mewat. After defeating Nasiruddin, Timur sent two envoys to Mewat State who invited the Wali of Mewat for a meeting with him. Nahar accepted this invitation and both met in 1398. As a gesture of goodwill and symbol of friendship Raja Nahar Khan gifted Timur two white parrots, which Timur praised highly. Timur himself, made prominent mention of the conduct of Nahar Khan during the Invasion of India in 1398 AD. Timur states that he sent an embassy to Nahar Khan at Kotila, to which a humble reply was received. Raja Nahar sent as a present two white parrots that belonged to the late Emperor. Timur remarks that these parrots were much prized by him.

Death 
In 1402, Nahar Khan was killed in an ambush by his in-laws of Kishangarh Bas. After his death, his son Raja Bahadur Khan succeeded him as Wali-e-Mewat.

Legacy 
He had nine sons namely Wali-e-Mewat Raja Bahadur Khan, Malik Alaudin Khan, Shah Mehmood Khan, Pir Shahab Khan, Malik Haroon Khan, Siraj Khan, Fateh Khan, Noor Khan and Nizam Khan. He was the progenitor of Khanzada Rajput community. Hasan Khan Mewati, Abdul Rahim Khan-i-Khanan, Nawab Feroz Khan, Khan Bahadur Fateh Naseeb Khan, Abdul Kadir Khanzada ,Tufail Ahmad khan, Suhaib Ilyasi  and Shahzeb Khanzada are his direct descendants.

Haveli Naharwali, in Kucha Sadullah Khan of Chandani Chowk in Old Delhi, is said to be originally owned by him, which later came in the ownership of family of former president of Pakistan, Pervez Musharraf, where he was born and his grandfather sold it to Prem Chand Gola after whom this area is now called Gola Market.

See also
 Raja Nahar Singh, Jat king of the princely state of Balramgarh in Faridabad District of Haryana

References 

 

Mewat
Indian Muslims
History of Haryana
Year of birth unknown
Converts to Islam
Converts to Islam from Hinduism
Islam in India